Thomas Kirk Caughey is a Scottish-born academic who served as a professor of applied mechanics. Thomas K. Caughey Dynamics Award is named after him.

Biography
Born in Rutherglen, Scotland, Caughey graduated with a bacelor's degree from the University of Glasgow. Later, he moved to the United States as a Fulbright scholar and attended Cornell University. In 1954, he completed his PhD from Caltech.

Caughey started his career as an instructor and later served as a professor of applied mathematics and mechanical engineering between 1955 and 1996.

In 1994, he became the Richard L. and Dorothy M. Hayman Professor of Mechanical Engineering and served until 2004.

References

Scottish scholars and academics
Cornell University alumni
Alumni of the University of Glasgow
California Institute of Technology alumni
Living people
Year of birth missing (living people)